List of Iranian cinematographers
 Ovanes Ohanian
 Mirza Ebrahim Khan Akkas Bashi
 Hossein Jafarian
Amin Jafari
Mehdi Jafari
Peyman Shademanfar
Masud Salami
 Mahmoud Kalari
 Darius Khondji
 Mahmoud Koushan
 Firooz Malekzadeh
 Amir Mokri
 Morteza Poursamadi
 Javad Jalali
 Aziz Saati
 Mirza Ebrahim Khan Sahhafbashi
 Found Najafzadeh
 Houshanf Banaei
 Gholamreza Jannatkhahdoost

External links
 Iranian film at the Internet Movie Database